Radical 21 or Radical spoon meaning "spoon" is one of the 23 Kangxi radicals (214 radicals total) composed of two strokes.

In the Kangxi Dictionary, there are 19 characters (out of 49,030) to be found under this radical.

 is also the 15th indexing component in the Table of Indexing Chinese Character Components predominantly adopted by Simplified Chinese dictionaries published in mainland China.

Evolution

Derived characters

Variant forms

 as a component of Chinese characters takes different forms in different printing typefaces or different Chinese characters.

The nuance of this character applies to both printing and handwriting forms.

Literature

External links

Unihan Database - U+5315

021
015